Pomy may refer to several places:

 Pomy VD, in Switzerland
 Pomy, Aude, a commune of the Aude département, in France